Aboroto is a Village located in Lujule payam of Morobo County in Central Equatoria State of South Sudan. It is also where Aboroto PHCC is located.

The Village is near the border with DR Congo's Ituri Provence and is a historical business center for coffee in the early 1970's.

In 2019 the south Sudan government Force classed with the NAS force along Aboroto on

References 

Populated places in Central Equatoria